Pre-production or preproduction may refer to:

 Pre-production, the process of preparing all the elements involved in a film, play, or other performance

 Pre-production car, a vehicle that allows automakers to find problems before a new model goes on sale to the public
 Pre-production period, the silent period of second-language acquisition